

A
LeRoy Andrews,
Chalmers Ault

B
Carl Bacchus,
Herm Bagby,
George Baldwin,
Herb Bauer,
Scotty Bierce,
Al Bloodgood,
Phil Branon,
Obie Bristow,
Hal Broda,
Karl Broadley,
Hal Burt

C
Glenn Carberry,
Carl Cardarelli,
Les Caywood,
Guy Chamberlin,
Chase Clements,
Alf Cobb,
Tom Cobb,
Rudy Comstock,
Larry Conover,
Cookie Cunningham,

D
Herb DeWitz

E
Gus Eckberg,
Cap Edwards,
Doc Elliott

F
Tiny Feather,
Benny Friedman

G
Frank Garden

H
Charlie Honaker,
Dosey Howard

J
Ben Jones,
Jerry Jones

K
Frank Kelley,
Walt Kreinheder,
Jerry Krysl,
Rudy Kutler

L
Ed Loucks,
Link Lyman

M
Harry McGee,
Russ Meredith,
Al Michaels,
Stan Muirhead,
Lyle Munn,
Truck Myers

N
Nick Nardacci,
Al Nesser,
Dave Noble,
Raymond Norton

O
Duke Osborn,
Bill Owen,
Steve Owen

P
Gordon Peery

R
Proc Randels,
Milt Rehnquist,
Wooky Roberts

S
Walt Sechrist,
Maury Segal,
Jim Simmons,
Clyde Smith,
Olin Smith,
Russ Smith,
Bob Spiers,
Hugh Sprinkle,
Gene Stringer,
Paul Suchy

T
John Tanner,
Rex Thomas

V
Ralph Vince

W
Dutch Wallace,
Dutch Webber,
Ossie Wiberg,
Dick Wolf,
Joe Work,
Hoge Workman,
Ink Williams

Y
Swede Youngstrom

References
Pro Football Reference Cleveland Bulldogs Roster

 
Cleveland Bulldogs
Bulldogs players